The Mounichia or Mounichia was an ancient Athenian festival held on the 16th (full moon time) of the month Mounichion (spring) of Athenian calendar in the honor of Artemis Mounichia. The surname of the goddess come from the hill of Munichia, where stood an Artemis’ temple, close to Piraeus and to the site of the Battle of Salamis. The festival was instituted to commemorate the victory of the Greek fleet over the Persians at Salamis. Cakes adorned all round with burning candles were offered to the goddess. Young girls were dressed up as bears, as for the Brauronia.

Sources
Dictionary of Greek and Roman Antiquities edited by William Smith (1870) p.769

Festivals in ancient Athens
Festivals of Artemis